The National Gallery is an art gallery and one of Thailand's national museums. It is located on Chao Fa Road in Bangkok's historic Phra Nakhon District, and is housed in the building of the former Royal Thai Mint. The gallery's collections range from traditional Thai art to the Western-influenced portraiture of the 19th century and modern and contemporary works.

History 
The building that houses the Gallery was built in 1902 as the site of the Royal Mint. It was designed in the neo-Palladian style by Italian engineer Carlo Allegri. The mint, which employed imported European machinery, operated here until 1968.

On April 19, 1974, the Treasury Department and Ministry of Finance presented the old Royal Mint building to the Fine Arts Department to be converted into the National Gallery. The grand opening took place on August 8, 1977, to celebrate Queen Sirikit's birthday which took place on 12 August.

Space

See also
 List of national galleries

References

External links 

 Thailand Museum - National Gallery 

Art museums and galleries in Thailand
Museums in Bangkok
National museums of Thailand
Registered ancient monuments in Bangkok
Thailand
Neoclassical architecture in Thailand